The Magician is a 2006 Turkish comedy-drama film, directed by Cem Yılmaz and Ali Taner Baltacı, about a magician who tours around Turkey with his father and best friend so that he can make enough money for laser eye surgery.

Production
The film was shot on location in Istanbul, Gallipoli and Eceabat, Turkey.

Plot
Iskender is a juggler, but to everyone besides himself and his childhood friend, Maradona, he is actually a magician. The two friends undertake a great deal of risk by including Sait in their tour program while being forced to escape Istanbul. Moreover, Father Sait had stopped appreciating Iskender years ago. While the tour brings them much closer, it also results in a magnificent falling-out. Iskender, Maradona, and Sait keep coming back together and falling out with their fellow traveler, Fatma.

Cast
Cem Yılmaz as İskender Tünaydın
Mazhar Alanson as Sait Tünaydın
Özlem Tekin as Fatma Nur Gaye Türksönmez
Tuna Orhan as Maradona - Orhan Direk

Release 

Reception

Box Office
The film was number one at the Turkish box office for two weeks running and has made a total worldwide gross of $9,146,764.

Reviews 
Todd Brown, writing for Twitch Film, notes that this film, looks to be a beautifully shot piece of work, and that, while it was impossible not to see an awful lot of Mel Brooks influence on [the writer-director's previous film] G.O.R.A. this one sees Yilmaz in a much more restrained mode that I think plays a fair bit better.

Awards
2007 Ankara International Film Festival Most Promising Actor: Tuna Orhan (Won)
2007 Brussels International Independent Film Festival Best Actor (International Competition): Cem Yilmaz (Won)
2007 Istanbul International Film Festival Golden Tulip: Cem Yilmaz & Ali Taner Baltaci (Nominated)
2007 Sadri Alışık Cinema and Theater Award for Best Actor: Cem Yilmaz (Nominated)

See also 
 2006 in film

External links

References

2006 films
2000s Turkish-language films
2006 comedy-drama films
Films about magic and magicians
Films set in Turkey
Turkish comedy-drama films
Films scored by Ozan Çolakoğlu